R. P. Goyal was an Indian career banker who served as the tenth Chairman of State Bank of India.

Life 

He was born and raised in the Indian city of Mumbai.

He died on 22 October 2011 in Worli,Mumbai. His obituary was published by The Times of India on 23 October 2011.

Career

Early career 

He had joined the State Bank of India as a probationary officer and served in a number of roles until finally becoming the Chairman of State Bank of India in 1983.

Banking career 

He served as the tenth Chairman of State Bank of India from 31 January 1983 until 30 November 1983.

After his retirement in 1983, he was succeeded by Vishwanath N. Nadkarni as the Chairman of State Bank of India.

Later career 

After having retired from the State Bank of India in 1983, he became a lifelong member of the Institute of Cost Accountants of India.

References

External links 

 SBI chairmen
 SBI history

Indian bankers
State Bank of India
Chairmen of the State Bank of India
Indian corporate directors
People from Mumbai
2011 deaths

Year of birth missing